Spangler Spring Run  is a Pennsylvania stream which flows from near Culp's Hill to the Rock Creek through Gettysburg Battlefield areas of the Battle of Gettysburg, Second Day, to Rock Creek (Monocacy River) at .

References

Rivers of Adams County, Pennsylvania
Gettysburg Battlefield
Rivers of Pennsylvania
Tributaries of the Monocacy River